The Kwikwetlem First Nation, also known as the Coquitlam Indian Band, is the band government of the Kwikwetlem, a Sto:lo people living in the Coquitlam area of British Columbia, Canada. They traditionally speak the Downriver dialect of hən̓q̓əmin̓əm̓, one of the Salishan family of languages. The name Kwikwetlem refers to "red fish up the river".

The Nation is made up of two reserves, a small 2.6-hectare site near the mouth of the Coquitlam River where it drains into the Fraser River, and a much larger 82-hectare site approximately 2.5 km north. About 36% of all Kwikwetlem members live on Coquitlam No. 1, 41% live elsewhere in Canada, and roughly 23% reside throughout the United States.

Government
The band is led by an elected council, with the current term running from April 1, 2019, to March 27, 2023:
 Chief: Ed Hall
 Councillor: George Chaffee
 Councillor: John Peters

Geography
Historically, the Kwikwetlem's territory covered and extended a moderate distance beyond the Coquitlam River and Pitt River watersheds. Today, there are two Indigenous Reserves under the administration of the Kwikwetlem First Nation.

Coquitlam 1 
Coquitlam Indian Reserve No. 1 is the main reserve for the Kwikwetlem Nation, housing its administrative offices and all of its on-reserve population. It is situated at an ancient village site.

Coquitlam 2 
Coquitlam Indian Reserve No. 2 is the secondary reserve of the Kwikwetlem Nation. It is currently subject of a process of having a business park developed on the site.

Notes

References

External links
 Official website

Sto:lo governments
Politics of Coquitlam
First Nations governments in the Lower Mainland